Muricopsis (Muricopsis) perexigua is a species of sea snail, a marine gastropod mollusk in the family Muricidae, the murex snails or rock snails.

Description
The shell grows to  a length of 7 mm.

Distribution
This species is distributed in the Caribbean Sea along Belize and Honduras; in the Atlantic Ocean along the Bahamas.

References

Muricidae
Gastropods described in 1994